Banqiao may refer to:

Taiwan
Banqiao District, seat of New Taipei

Mainland China
Banqiao Dam, dam on the Ru River near Zhumadian, Henan that suffered an infamous failure in 1975
Banqiao Town (disambiguation)
Banqiao Township (disambiguation)